Asaf Avidan (born March 23, 1980) is a singer-songwriter from Israel. From 2006 to 2011, he was part of the group Asaf Avidan & the Mojos, independently releasing three studio albums. The Reckoning, their debut record, was certified Gold in Israel and became one of the best-selling independent albums in the country. After disbanding in 2011, a 2012 remix of Asaf Avidan & the Mojos' single "Reckoning Song" (2008) by German disc jockey Wankelmut — retitled into One Day / Reckoning Song — attained widespread commercial success throughout Europe. It topped the charts in several countries and was certified Gold and Platinum. In 2012, Avidan started a solo career, eventually releasing three studio albums to moderate success in European countries.

Life and career

1980–2006: Early life and career
Asaf Avidan was born on 23 March 1980 in Jerusalem to diplomats for the Israeli Foreign Office. He spent four years of his childhood in Jamaica, attending The Priory School, and also grew up in New York. Avidan's grandparents emigrated from Romania to Israel. He completed mandatory army service in the Israel Defense Forces, and studied animation at Jerusalem's Bezalel Academy of Arts and Design, with his final project short film "Find Love Now" winning an award at the Haifa Film Festival that year. Subsequently, Avidan moved to Tel Aviv and worked as an animator. In 2006, after breaking up with his long-time girlfriend, he moved back to Jerusalem, desiring to pursue a music career; this resulted in his debut and sole extended play (EP) Now That You're Leaving (2006).

2006–2011: Asaf Avidan & the Mojos

In late 2006, while on tour in Israel, Avidan and Ran Nir decided to put together a band, who would consist of Nir on bass guitar, Yoni Sheleg (Johnny Snow) on drums, Roi Peled on guitar and backing vocals, Hadas Kleinman on cello, and Avidan on lead vocals, guitar and harmonica. The group's original name was Asaf Avidan & the Mojo Jive Cats, but it was soon after shortened to Asaf Avidan & the Mojos.

Throughout 2006 and 2008, Asaf Avidan & the Mojos rose to major fame in Israel, receiving recording proposals from multiple local labels. However, the group released their debut studio album The Reckoning independently in March 2008, founding Telmavar Records with Avidan's brother Roie. The album was met with critical and commercial acclaim, reaching Gold status in Israel. With over 20,000 copies sold in the territory, The Reckoning became one of the best-selling independently released records. It was aided by two singles — "Reckoning Song" and "Weak" — as well as by a tour throughout Europe. Later in 2012, a remix of "Reckoning Song" by German disc jokey Wankelmut — retitled into "One Day / Reckoning Song" — would attain widespread commercial success, topping the charts and being certified Gold and Platinum in countries including Germany, Italy and Netherlands. The single's attention would lead to The Reckoning entering the record charts in various European regions in 2012.

Poor Boy / Lucky Man, the band's second album, was released in Israel in September 2009 to favorable reviews. For promotion, the band embarked on a worldwide tour from 2009 to 2011, during which they had appeared and performed on several notable occasions in Germany, France, China and the United States. Meanwhile, Asaf Avidan and the Mojos premiered their third and last record Through the Gale in November 2010. They announced that they would take an indefinite creative break; Avidan attributed this to their desire "to experiment with new sounds and different genres that [they] couldn't really do in [their] band because we were about rock, blues, and folk." However, Avidan soon after announced that the group would disband because of his desire to pursue a solo career.

2012–present: Solo career

In 2012, Avidan released the single "Different Pulses", followed by the premiere of his debut solo studio album of the same name. For promotion, the singer embarked on a European tour where he also performed during the 2013 Sanremo Music Festival in Italy. Commercially, Different Pulses attained success, entering record charts in various countries and being awarded a Platinum certification by France's Syndicat National de l'Édition Phonographique (SNEP). The singer's follow-up record Gold Shadow (2015) was similarly successful in Europe and reached Gold status in France. The album was also aided by several venues, including in Boston, United States. The Study on Falling followed in 2017. In the same year, Avidan was featured on the song "Baila Leila" from Bosnian musician Goran Bregović's Three Letters from Sarajevo (2017).

Controversy
In a March 2015 interview conducted by French newspaper Le Monde, Avidan stated: "I don't really feel Israeli. As Israelis, what unites us is the fear. We are always the persecuted, and that is why I am no longer interested in living in Israel, to not feel that fear". The singer's statement sparked controversy and received widespread commentary and media attention in Israel, prompting Avidan to respond by saying: "In every interview I gave from the first second I always said I am not an Israeli artist, but an artist from Israel. I am not coming to represent Israel. I am not a politician. I am not a diplomat. And as a son to diplomats I never wanted to be one".

Discography

As part of Asaf Avidan & the Mojos

Studio albums

Singles

Solo

Albums
Studio albums

Live albums

Extended plays

Singles

References

External links
 
 Official Soundcloud profile
 

1980 births
21st-century Israeli male singers
Israeli rock music groups
Israeli people of Romanian-Jewish descent
Living people
Musical groups established in 2006
Israeli male singer-songwriters
Israeli soul singers
Israeli blues singers
Fiction Records artists
Israeli male voice actors